"Toother" is a 2007 horror short story by Terry Dowling.

Background
"Toother" was first published in the United States in 2007 in the science fiction and fantasy anthology Eclipse One, edited by Jonathan Strahan and published by Night Shade Books. In 2008 "Toother" was republished in The Year's Best Fantasy and Horror 2008: Twenty-First Annual Collection edited by Kelly Link, Gavin J. Grant, Ellen Datlow.

"Toother" won the 2007 Australian Shadows Award beating works by Matthew Chrulew, David Conyers, Rick Kennett, Martin Livings, and Jason Nahrung. "Toother" was also a short-list nominee for the 2007 Aurealis Award for best horror short story but lost to Anna Tambour's "The Jeweller of Second-Hand Roe".

References

External links
Eclipse One at Night Shade Books

2007 short stories
Australian short stories
Horror short stories